CHEX-DT (channel 12) is a television station in Peterborough, Ontario, Canada, part of the Global Television Network. Owned and operated by network parent Corus Entertainment, the station maintains studios on Monaghan Road (near Rose Avenue) in the southern portion of Peterborough, and its transmitter is located on Television Hill, just outside the city.

History 
The station signed on the air on March 26, 1955, as an independently-owned affiliate of CBC Television; its inaugural broadcast was a National Hockey League ice hockey game. CHEX was founded by a media partnership that already published The Peterborough Examiner newspaper and owned radio station CHEX (now CKRU). The partnership included politician Rupert Davies, who was also involved in a similar arrangement in Kingston that established CKWS-TV. The Davies family sold its media interests to Power Corporation of Canada in 1976. On April 13, 2000, the station was acquired by Canadian media conglomerate Corus Entertainment.

On May 20, 2015, Corus and Bell Media announced an agreement whereby its three CBC stations would leave the public network (after 60 years in the case of CHEX) and "affiliate" with CTV. The affiliation switch took effect on August 31, 2015. Most TV service providers serving the region already carry CBLT, and any that do not will have to add a CBC affiliate such as CBLT to their basic services in order to comply with Canadian Radio-television and Telecommunications Commission (CRTC) regulations. 

Legally the affiliation with CTV was described as a "program supply agreement", and not as an "affiliation" (a term with specific legal implications under CRTC rules), as Corus maintained editorial control over the stations' programming and the ability to sell local advertising, and did not delegate responsibility for CTV programs aired by the station to Bell Media. The switch was approved by the CRTC on August 27, 2015, dismissing objections by Rogers Media (who argued that the change was an "affiliation" and thus required CRTC consent to implement, and was not in the public interest because it created duplicate sources of CTV programming), and by a resident who complained that because he only received television over the air, he would lose his ability to receive CBC Television as a result of the disaffiliation. 

Following the expiration of CHEX's three-year deal with CTV, the station became a Global owned-and-operated station (O&O) and rebranded itself as Global Peterborough on August 27, 2018; the CHEX branding will be retained for the station's newscasts.

News operation 
Local newscasts, branded as CHEX News, air weekdays from 6-9 a.m., at 12:00 p.m., weeknights at 5:00, 5:30, 6:00, and 11:00 p.m., and weekends at 6:00 p.m. 

In September 2016, CHEX began to replace CTV News programming with Global News programs, moving its late-night newscast to 11 p.m. to replace the CTV National News (the vacant timeslot at 11:30 p.m. was replaced with ET Canada), and adding an airing of Global National. On October 24, 2016, CHEX premiered a local morning newscast known as The Morning Show, which was patterned after the program of the same name aired by CIII-DT and the Global News Morning format used in other markets.

Technical information

Subchannels

Analogue-to-digital conversion
CHEX-TV began offering a high definition feed on Cogeco Cable in the Peterborough area in November 2010. The station switched its over-the-air signal from analogue to digital on May 9, 2013.

The CRTC has not listed Peterborough as one of its mandatory markets for analogue television shutdown and digital conversion, and as a result CHEX-TV was not required to convert to digital transmissions on the transition date of August 31, 2011.

Transmitters
In 1965, CHEX-TV was authorized to add a rebroadcast transmitter at Bancroft, Ontario on channel 2 as CHEX-TV-1, but it moved to channel 4 in 1973 to make room for a new Global transmitter (CIII-TV-2). In the late 1960s to early 1970s, a new rebroadcast transmitter was added in Minden to operate on channel 10 as CHEX-TV-2, later changed to channel 7. The Minden rebroadcaster was deleted during the 1980s. In 1992, a new rebroadcast transmitter was added to serve Oshawa and areas on channel 22, as CHEX-TV-2.

References

External links
Global Peterborough

Corus Entertainment
HEX-DT
Mass media in Peterborough, Ontario
Television channels and stations established in 1955
HEX-DT
1955 establishments in Ontario